= Apostata capiendo =

Apostate capiendo (Latin for "taking an apostate") was an old English writ against an individual. It prescribed the arrest of a person, who having entered and professed some religious order (such as a monk), broke from his cloister, contrary to the rules of his order.

== See also ==
- Advocatione decimarum
- Apostasy
- Chartis reddendis
